ILF Samanvay, initiated by the India Habitat Centre, is a one-of-its-kind Indian Languages Festival held annually in New Delhi. The first Samanvay was held in 2011. ILF Samanvay was conceived in 2011 as an annual celebration of writing in Indian languages. The festival has aimed at generating dialogue across Indian languages at various levels and has emerged as the only literature festival dedicated exclusively to Indian languages.

2011 inaugural
The inaugural edition (2011) tried to explore the problem of bringing various literatures under the master signifier, "Indian" and the mysterious bond that makes these various literatures at once distinct and collective. In 2012, the festival moved on to highlight and discover the heritage of Indian languages through the strain of Boli, Baani, Bhasha:  Gaon, Kasba, Shehar.  Even in 2013 the theme Jodti Zubanein, Judti Zubanein: Language Connections aimed at -discussing the various kinds of dialogues across the 'regional' languages and their multifaceted interaction with the 'national' languages - Hindi and English. In 2014, Samanvay highlighted ‘Translation/Transnation’
focus on Indian languages which have a transnational presence.

The first four editions of the festival featured 20 languages presented by more than 150 Writers including some of the contemporary masters like Sitakant Mahapatra, Ratan Thiyam, K. Satchidanandan, Ashok Vajpeyi, Sheen Kaaf Nizam, Girish Kasaravalli,
Udaya Narayana Singh, Nabarun Bhattacharya, Rajendra Yadav, Mangalesh Dabral,
Yumlembam Ibomcha, Arjun Deo Charan, Anupam 
Mishra, Gulzar, Jerry Pinto, Ketan Mehta, Mahesh Bhatt, Mukul Kesavan,
Piyush Mishra, Ravish Kumar, Sharada Sinha, Sanjay Kak, Shashi Deshpande,
Kavita Krishnan,  Vrinda Grover, Kancha Ilaiah,
Alok Rai, K. Sivareddy, Manoranjan Byapari, Nirupama Dutt, Rooprekha Verma,
Sylvanus Lamare, Tenzin Tsundue, Viveka Rai Harrish Iyer, Namvar Singh, Swanand Kirkire,
Vinay Pathak, Arunava Sinha and Varun Grover.

Awards
The festival bestows two major awards:

 The Vani-Samanvay Distinguished Translator Award
The ILF Samanvay Bhasha Samman which is given to recognise the best book written in the last five years in any of the focal languages of the festival in any given year. This award was a lifetime achievement award till 2014, but was changed to a book award in 2015. Tamil Writer Perumal Murugan's Mathorubhagan (One Part Woman) has been named for the ILF Samanvay Bhasha Samman 2015. 
ILF Samanvay 2015: Insider/Outsider: Writing India's Dreams and Realities

This year from 26 to 29 November, India Habitat Centre (IHC) will celebrate the 5thedition of its
Indian Languages Festival – Samanvay 2015. The festival, which has over the years become a must-attend for the Capital's Art & Culture aficionados, has expanded its scope to engage a wider range of audience by bringing into its panels, multi-level interpretations of the central theme,  ‘Insider/Outsider: Writing India’s Dreams and Realities’. The languages that will be explored in detail at ILF Samanvay. 2015 languages are Tamil, Bangla, Marathi and Dogri.

Overall design and logo

Amid rampant instability of thought and violence infecting communication, ILF Samanvay aspires
to thrive as a space for relevant reflection and uninhibited celebration of the inherent companionship of Indian linguistic cultures. Its overall design, including that of all its intellectual, physical and virtual sites, thus evokes India's cultural destiny vis-à-vis its multiple political aspirations on the one hand and the future of humanity at large on the other. Hence, the festival design reflects the concerns and responsibility of the Indian writers, artists and other creative thinkers towards creating a condition and environment to bring the multi-centred country into a cultural camaraderie rather than any attempt
at homogenisation.

The ILF Samanvay logo is the visual embodiment of the above design concept. While the curious
interweaving of straight lines and curves in the scripting of the term ‘Samanvay’ has from its inception reflected the continuum of tradition and modernity that the festival emphasises, it is branded as ILF Samanvay in its fifth year, considering its one-of-its-kind status in the country as a festival bringing Indian languages together. The revised logo marks the directional integrity in the organisation of the festival.

Riyas Komu
Artist Riyas Komu who conceptualised the new visual expression of the ILF Samanvay logo says: "In our times characterized by fragile thoughts and volatile expressions, an Indian languages festival such as Samanvay must live and present itself as a profound space for thinking. It must be a site to reflect on the past, present and future of humanity and nature at large. Hence, the attempt here has been to create a head space that represents the thoughtscape embedded in Indian languages.  Again, as we need an insignia for thinkers who can make relevant changes, the red dot becomes the mark of  that awareness.  The seven colours of the spectrum, capable of forming white light on their merger, are laid in a seed form in the line above the lettering of Samanvay in the logo. Another indication of the 'coming together' inherent in the festival, this linear mandala also  intimates one of the possibility of playing with each of these colours in specific contexts within the frame of the festival."

The festival will open with Education Thinker, Prof. Aijaz Ahmad discussing the possibility of evolving a methodology for language and literary studies in the country. Prof. Ahmad's  inaugural lecture, ‘The Languages  of a Union’, will highlight how in India, political unity does not automatically give us, or requires of us, literary or linguistic unity. He would discuss the significance of examining  the hierarchical relations existing among languages and traditions, and the need to develop a system of education that profoundly addresses the question of multilingualism.

2015
The deliberations at Samanvay 2015 will unfold with a session paying tributes to the late RK Laxman and his matchless legacy. Cartoonist Unny, Outlook Chief Editor Krishna Prasad, and cartoon researcher and writer, Christel Devadawson will together unravel the complex field of Indian cartooning while looking at Laxman's unique contribution to shaping its sensibilities. This session on the opening evening will lead the discourse of ‘Insider/Outsider’ forward into the main festival sessions.

The central theme of Samanvay 2015, Insider/Outsider: Writing India's Dreams and Realities,
evokes the liminality of the writer/creative artist/inventor in a given context. A creative act necessitates an individual to move out of a certain state of being, into an experimental space where she has to play out her ideas and desires into comprehensible forms. This transition makes every writer a liminal
being, an insider/outsider. Yet, some writers and artists become more of insiders and some others more of outsiders to the existing patterns. The subtitle suggests how writers who understand the in-between space of uncertainty, the transitory status that makes one neither here nor there, bring out the dreams and realities of a complex space such as India. It also points to the need for an artist to remain
tentative, and resist fixities.

Day 2 of Samanvay will focus on a thematic exploration of ‘Insider/Outsider’ in the contemporary socio-political and cultural context of India. Day 3 will feature sessions on the focal languages of Samanvay 2015, and Day 4 will attempt to expand the theme with the futuristic vision which the festival embodies.

Various workshops, volunteer sessions, conversations, book exhibitions and performances will also be an integral part of Samanvay 2015. Its democratic and inclusive spirit gets amply reflected in a special session on Day 2, which is completely designed by the student volunteers of Samanvay. This one-hour session titled Inside the Exile will feature readings by Tibetan writers followed by a Q&A to explore the Insider/Outsider aspects of being Tibetans in India. This session, among others, has ensured more youth participation in the organization of the festival. At Samanvay, the workshop sessions are not supplementary but are integral to the exploration of languages outside of the verbal realm, too. On
Day 3, a translation workshop has been planned with exercises that would lead to a publication. Avadhesh Kumar Singh, Dean of School of Translation Studies at IGNOU will be in charge of this.

2015 summary
Spread over four days with multiple events, ILF Samanvay 2015 will ensure that the theme is carried on to extra-literary and epistemic fields too. The sessions concerning the child's position vis-a-vis writing and publishing in the country; gender and sexuality; media and language; the architectural, ecological and cultural continuities and discontinuities that make the city of Delhi etc. are cases in point. The Art Appreciation workshop by the renowned cultural critic Sadanand Menon is a major value addition in this regard.

Talking about the festival, Rakesh Kacker, Festival Director Samanvay & Director - India Habitat Centre , says, “One does not necessarily have to recognise language as a basic instinct to properly appreciate its role as an organic part of human existence. Civilizations have been formed and continue to take shape around languages, uniting and dividing in swift strokes. This, precisely, is the theme we would explore in India Habitat Centre’s fifth annual Indian Languages’ Festival, Samanvay. In an increasingly globalised world the alienation that writers often face for their lingual and cultural choices is now a much hackneyed subject in the area of literary discourse. Here at Samanvay, we invite you to partake in the discussions that would take this conversation one step forward.”

Elaborating further, Rizio Yohannan Raj, Creative Director, ILF Samanvay says, “Samanvay is a relevant call to reawaken the Indian genius for cultural cooperation in our times. A dynamic yet nuanced
initiative to facilitate genuine camaraderie at the intersections of Indian languages, the festival celebrates the diversities embedded in the transnational matrix of the country. Through multiple verbal as well as transverbal media, and various modes of translation, Samanvay interprets Indian Languages beyond word-limits and explores the socio-historical connections among the idioms of literature, visual arts, music, performance. Towards fulfilling this larger vision of creativity and
institutionalising its enterprise, Samanvay’s inclusive framework presents workshops, freewheeling conversations, focussed discussions, public readings, exhibitions, performances. The festival theme for
2015, “Insider/Outsider: Writing India’s Dreams and Realities” emphasises the liminality of the creative individual in any given context, and all the sessions explore this notion quite intensely, thus lending the festival an organic as well as sustainable design.”

2015 speakers
The distinguished speakers include Tenzin Tsunde, Jeet Thayil, TM Krishna, Urvashi Butalia, Aman Nath, Ayesha Kidwai, Sadanand Menon,  Bhuchung Sonam, EP Unny, Arunava Sinha, Sachin Ketkar, AR Venkatachalapathy, Rakshanda Jalil, Bulbul Sharma, Avadhesh Kumar Singh, K Satchidanandan, Meena Alexander, Sharmila Seyyid, Padma Sachdev, Rosalyn DeMello,  Khushbu, Kannan Sundaram, Shubro
Bandyopadhyay, Dolochampa Chakravary, Ashok Vajpeyi Ramkumar Mukhopadhyay, Makarand Sathe, Iravati Karve, Vaibhav Abnave, Dharmakriti Sumant, Samina Mishra, Jerry Pinto, Radhika Menon, J Devika, Manabi Bandyopadhya, Saleem Kidwai, Priya Sarukkari Chhabria, Arundhathi Subramanian, H.S Shiva Prakash, Navtej Johar, Maya Krishna Rao, Anuradha Kapur, Come Carpentier, Fareeda Mehta, Margaret Mascarenhas.

AWARDS 

ILF Samanvay Bhasha Samman 2015

Tamil writer Peruman Murugan's novel Madhorubhagan has bagged the fourth ILF Samanvay Bhasha Samman, the prestigious annual award instituted by the IHC Indian Languages Festival Samanvay.  The award for 2015 was decided by an eminent jury chaired by K. Satchidanandan, and included as its other members  Sachin Ketkar, Manglesh Dabral, Mitra Phukan and Arundhati Subramaniam. The Jury selected Madhorubhagan after a detailed process of inviting nominations from five focal languages of ILF Samanvay 2015– Tamil, Marathi, Bangla, Dogri and Mizo. These nominations were then screened by the Award Advisors and a final selection was made by the Jury from the final
shortlist.

Jury Chair K Satchidanandan says:

"Perual Murugan's Madhorubhagan (One Part Woman) is a rooted and passionate work of fiction that narrates with searing intensity and unsparing clarity the story  of  a relationship caught between the dictates of social convention and the tug of personal anxieties. This historian of the Kongu region of Tamilnadu has brought into play his lyrical imagination, linguistic skill and  lexical knowledge in this honest exploration of the tyranny of caste and the pathology of a community.  Inspired by local folklore and history, this great work of fiction dreams of a secular future for communities in India that remain hostage to the ways of the past. It is an imaginative contribution by a versatile writer and scholar to the collective struggle for a new India free from the oppression of caste and enslaving conventions."

Responding to the award announcement Perumal Murugan gave this statement:

The IHC Director who is also the Festival Director of ILF Samanvay says: ‘It gives the IHC great pleasure to announce the ILF Samanvay Bhasha Samman for Perumal Murugan. The Tamil literary canon has been expanded with the induction of the series of novels and short stories that Perumal Murugan has written. Madhorubhagan occupies pride of place in this canon. This award for Madhorubhagan  is a recognition of how a writer and his insider-outsider act of writing could serve the society and connect its histories with its contemporary realities and dreams.”

Perumal Murugan is a well-known Tamil writer and poet. He has written nine novels and four
collections each of short stories and poetry. Three of his novels have  been translated into English to wide critical acclaim: Seasons of the Palm, which was shortlisted for the prestigious Kiriyama Prize in 2005, Current Show and One part  woman. He has received awards from the Tamil Nadu government as well as from Katha Books.

The ILF Samanvay Bhasha Samman has undergone a makeover this year. Till last year, named Samanvay Bhasha Samman, this honour was bestowed on an eminent writer who had contributed significantly to the growth of one or more Indian languages. Last year, the third Samanvay Bhasha Samman 2014 was conferred upon Ashok Vajpeyi, the well-known author, scholar, critic and poet for his lifelong contribution to Hindi Literature in particular and Indian Literature in general. The second Samanvay Bhasha Samman 2013 was conferred upon veteran  Gujarati  author Chandrakant  Topiwala  for "his lifetime contribution to  Gujarati and Indian literature; for his commitment for independence and objectivity in cultural life; for standing against the authoritarian forces in contemporary Indian society and broadening the scope of human empathy through an extraordinary body of work."

The inaugural award in 2012 had been conferred upon the legendary Odiya writer Sitakant Mahapatra for "his lifetime contribution to Odiya and Indian literature; for extraordinary efforts in generating dialogue across Indian languages through creative and administrative activism, for emancipation of dialects and oral traditions and for unrelenting advocacy of plurality of idea and expression."

Fifth year
In this fifth year of India Habit Centre's Indian Languages Festival Samanvay, as part of the rethinking of the festival as a significant and enduring space to facilitate growth, development of connections of Indian languages in the contemporary times,  it was decided that every year, an important literary work in one of the focal languages of the festival, should be given the award, as such a scheme is more aligned to the vision and mission of the ILF Samanvay. Hence, the Award has been named ILF Samanvay Bhasha Samman, and from a cluster of five languages from the five regions of the country—Tamil, Bangla, Dogri, Marathi and Mizo— nominations were called from a large panel of publishers, academicians, critics/writers. Works—Poetry Fiction Creative non-fiction; e.g. Autobiographies, Travelogues, Memoirs, etc.—published in the last 5 years in these languages were considered. To begin the process, each language's advisers suggested 5 critics/writers, 5 academicians, and 5 publishers who sent in their nominations in an elaborate format prepared for this purpose. Each nominator sent 3 nominations, and filled up the questionnaire  in justification of the nomination.

Criteria for nominations specified that the book should:

i) Preferably have been translated in any other Indian Language. This criterion, however, is NOT mandatory.

ii) Have been published between Jan 2010—Dec 2014.

iii) Be considered significant in the particular language.

iv) Have brought a breakthrough in the literary scenario of that particular language.

v) Have extended the frontiers of language and style vi) be not just commercial but aesthetically rich.

vi) Have some social and/or literary substance to it.

vii) Challenge established norms.

viii) Have brought a shift in the canon.

ix) Have made a considerable impact on the language it has been written in.

x) The advisers are free to add books over and above the nominations received per language.

Shortlisting

The advisers of Bangla, Dogri, Marathi and Tamil shortlisted 2 books per language. Though nominations were received from Mizo, the advisors did not recommend any for the award. Each panel of advisors of the four languages prepared a critical justification for the members of the jury explaining their choice for the 2 books shortlisted. From among these 8 nominations the jury members chose Perumal Murugan's Madhorubhagan.

Shortlisted works

1. Bangla

Prabal Kumar Basu, Bhalo Bolte Shikhun, Anita Agnihotri, Desher Bhitor Desh

2. Dogri

Om Goswami, Unni Sou Santali, Lalit Magotra, Hello Maya

3. Marathi

Mahabaleswara Sail, Tandav, L. S. Jadhav, Horpal

4. Tamil

Perumal Murugan, Madhorubhagan, Imayam, Savu Soru

The award ceremony is scheduled between 6pm and 7pm on Saturday the 28th of November at the India Habitat Centre, New Delhi.

Vani-Samanvay Distinguished Translator Award 

The commitment of ILF Samanvay to the development of a democracy of Indian languages 
is asserted by the announcement of a major Award for a distinguished translator, and a couple of interesting prizes for young writers.  In the wake of Tamil Writer Peruman Murugan's novel Madhorubhagan (One Part Woman) bagging the fourth ILF Samanvay Bhasha Samman, the festival organisers have announced yet another much-awaited and relevant annual award which ILF Samanvay has instituted in collaboration with Vani Foundation: Vani-Samanvay Distinguished Translator Award.

Scheduled from 26 to 29 November 2015, ILF Samanvay 2015 has expanded its scope to engage a wider section of the society.  It is as part of enlarging its mandate that a national level award for a distinguished translator who has contributed in a sustained and quality manner towards direct
exchanges between two Indian languages, has been instituted. This award will be given as part of the activities initiated by ILF Samanvay every year. The India Habitat Centre and Vani Foundation have jointly conceptualised this award in view of the lack of recognitions encouraging direct exchanges between Indian languages without a mediating language. This award is hoped to encourage contemporary translators in the linguistically diverse sub-continent with a rich history of literary
exchange.

The award is worth INR 1,00,000 (Rupees One lakh) and as far as possible this award will consider translators directly translating between two Indian languages and have sustained this activity for a
considerable period of time and produced a remarkable body of work. The jury of the award include writers Namita Gokhale, Ashok Vajpeyi, Rizio Yohannan Raj, IHC Programmes Director Vidyun Singh, NBT Director and writer Rita Choudhury, and writer-scholar Rita Kothari.

Announcing the institution of Vani-Samanvay Distinguished Translator Award, the Director
of India Habitat Centre, Rakesh Kacker said: "I am delighted that this award has fructified in a very short period. Thanks and Congratulations to all who have made this happen. The addition of this award to ILF Samanvay's range of activities will help to enrich the festival and its institutional mission.  It would also strengthen the important work of translation and help different linguistic groups in the country to communicate meaningfully with one another."

Arun Maheshwari, the Chairman of Vani Foundation, that has co-founded the Award, said on the occasion: "Our country's rich cultural diversity and its expression into arts and literature have been
largely unexplored. Vani Foundation was established with the mission of not only re-discovering these idioms, but also connecting Indian languages with one another and with the world. We found congruence of energy and vision with the new team at ILF Samanvay and
therefore feel proud to announce Vani-Samanvay Distinguished Translator Award. The award is committed to celebrate the unsung heroes of Indian translation fraternity, especially those who have
tirelessly dedicated themselves to not only translating between two languages, but also bridging two cultures."

The Vani-Samanvay Distinguished Translator award is in keeping with the great emphasis ILF Samanvay has laid on translation this year. The festival has initiated a collaborative translation project with the School of Translation Studies and Training, IGNOU, besides three festival panels dedicated exclusively to look at various issues concerning translation in the county.

Poetry contest

HIR-PITHARA youth poetry contest

As part of expanding its mandate, and reaching out to nurture the creativity of the young speakers of different Indian languages in the Delhi-NCR region, ILF Samanvay has also announced an interesting  youth poetry contest as part of the festival: The HIR-PITHARA YOUTH POETRY CONTEST. The mascot of this poetry contest is the resplendent figure of HIR—the ageless, androgynous, itinerant storyteller.(Mascot attached)

Speaking of Hir, Rizio Yohannan Raj, Creative Director of ILF Samanvay said: "Hir (Pronounced ‘heer’) is a quintessential insider-outsider, true to the time and the theme-zone wherein hir arrives at ILF Samanvay in Delhi. Hir is a child-adult of the future, and begins hir travel mid-way, in classic medias
res, at ILF Samanvay. Hir is pronoun and noun at once; Hir is a child's self-expression as well as an adult's quest for meaning. Hir represents the ‘samanvay’ of the self and the other in our fragmented times. Red-robed, Hir is the self-same heart of pure revolution and ardent love. In the coming days, we shall see Hir extending travel from Delhi to different time zones, varied spacescapes, carrying hir
‘Pithara’ , gathering creative voices from among the young and the young at heart of the country. Inspired by the 9-year old Adel Tushar Kumar's uninhibited painting of a storyteller, Hir is given hir current form by the ILF Samanvay team. Hir Stories are going to be a regular feature of Y: The ILF Samanvay Blog."

ILF Samanvay 2015 invites poetry submissions for the HIR-PITHARA poetry contest 2015 in all Indian languages. One can submit any number of poems in one’s original language, on the theme
"Insider/Outsider’.  The length of poem has to be limited to one A4 size page, and has to be separately submitted in the specified format, along with a translation in either English or Hindi.

This journey of Hir in the context of IL F Samanvay through the historical city of Delhi is to map, mainstream and celebrate Delhi's hidden pockets of creativity.  Poetry submissions can either be made online in the requisite format available on www.ilfsamanvay.org or dropped at the Hir-Pitharas (Poetry bags) kept  at the IHC campus in Lodhi Road and in select locations. The hard copy submission must mark the name, age, address and affiliation of the participant. Details will be available online at
the ILF Samanvay website from Tuesday, 20 October.

The last date of submission is 5 Nov 2015. Seven poets from different languages will be selected and they will be invited to read their prize-winning entry at the theme session of ILF Samanvay 2015 on 27 Nov 2015 evening, along with senior poets from different languages.

ILF Samanvay invites young people in the city to write poetry in their own languages and reclaim the lost vitality of a region that inspired many a poet and artist to make monumental works of beauty for
generations to cherish.

Announcement of winners: 18 November

HIR-E-PITHARA Twitter poetry contest

The Hir-e-Pithara Twitter Poetry Contest is a Twitter-only contest that recognizes how information technology, and specifically social media platforms have created new literary expressions, quite distinct from all other ages. The contest is open to poets in all the 22 This fresh mode is a product of its time, and this contest is ILF Samanvay's way to understand and nurture it as a specific movement of the times we are living in.

Participants can send in one submission in one tweet, based on the theme Insider/Outsider by 5 November 2015. A participant can submit any number of tweet poems. The participants can choose to send either a poem originally in English or in translation from any of the 22 languages in the eighth schedule. The participants have to hashtag the first 3 characters of the original language (E.g.: #MAL for Malayalam, #ENG for English etc.). One winning entry will be awarded the ILF Samanvay New Age Creativity Certificate. The winner of the HIR-E-PITHARA contest will also get a chance to recite their
work along with the winners of the HIR PITHARA Youth poetry contest.

References

Literary festivals in India
Recurring events established in 2011
2011 establishments in Delhi
Fairs in Delhi
Languages of India